Kim Hae-Gyeong (hangul: 김해경, hanja: 金海卿, September 23, 1910 – April 17, 1937), also known as his pen name Yi Sang (hangul: 이상, hanja: 李箱) was a writer and poet who lived in Korea under Japanese rule. He is well-known for his poems and novels, such as Crow's-Eye View (hangul: 오감도, hanja: 烏瞰圖) and Wings (hangul: 날개). He is considered as one of the most important and revolutionary writers of modern Korean literature.

Life
Kim Hae-Gyeong was born in Seoul, Korea on September 23, 1910 (August 20, 1910 in lunar calendar), in Seoul. His father Kim Young-Chang worked in the letterpress printing service in a palace before his birth, but after an accident that cut off his finger, he opened a barbershop and made their living. He was raised by his uncle Kim Yeon-Pil (hangul: 김연필, hanja: 金演弼) since 1913, because Yeon-Pil and his wife had no children at that point. Later, however, Yeon-Pil takes Kim Young-Sook (hangul: 김영숙, hanja: 金英淑) as his concubine and the son she already had, Kim Moon-Kyung (hangul: 김문경, hanja: 金汶卿), became a legal son of Yeon-Pil.

Donggwang School was merged into Posung School at 1922.). He met his friend Koo Bon-Woong (hangul: 구본웅, hanja: 具本雄) at Sinmyeong School. The Posung School record shows that he wanted to become an artist.

In 1926, he entered  (hangul: 경성고등공업학교, hanja: 京城高等工業學校), which was the most prominent tertiary education institution at that time, majoring architecture. In 1928, he graduated the college with 1st place honor. In the graduation photobook, he used his writing name Yi Sang (hangul: 이상, hanja: 李箱) for the first time, as far as known. In 1929, with the recommendation through the college, he was employed as a public official (hangul: 기수, hanja: 技手) in the architecture team in the department of domestic affairs (hangul: 내무국 건축과, hanja: 內務局 建築課) of the Government-General of Korea (hangul: 조선총독부, hanja: 朝鮮總督府). At November, he moved his position to the building maintenance team of the department of secretariat and accounting (hangul: 관방회계과 영선계, hanja: 官房會計課 營繕係).

In December 1929, he became a member of Joseon Architecture Society (Joseon Geonchukhoe, hangul: 조선건축회, hanja: 朝鮮建築會), of which the members were mainly Japanese architects in Korea, and he won first and third prizes in a design contest for the cover of Joseon and Architecture (Joseongwa Geonchuk, Japanese: 朝鮮と建築, hangul: 조선과건축), a journal issued by the Joseon Architecture Society. Most of his works were produced during the 1930s.

In 1934 he joined the Circle of Nine (Guinhoe, hangul: 구인회, hanja: 九人會), of which core members included Kim Kirim, Lee Taejun, and Jung Jiyong. In 1936 Lee began to edit Siwa soseol (hangul: 시와 소설), the Circle of Nine magazine, published by Changmunsa under the aegis of Koo Bonung. Several of his works were published in this journal, including his poems “Paper gravestone” (Jibi, hangul: 지비, hanja: 紙碑), “Street exterior, street passage” (Gaoe gajeon, hangul: 가외가전, hanja: 街外街傳), and “Condition serious” (Widok, hangul: 위독, hanja: 危篤) and the stories “Meeting of a spider and a pig” (Jijuhoesi, hangul: 지주회시, hanja: 踟鼄會豕), “Wings” (Nalgae, hangul: 날개), “Meetings and Farewells” (Bongbyeolgi, hangul: 봉별기), and “Children's Skulls” (Donghae, hangul: 동해, hanja: 童骸). His short story “Diary Before Death” (Jongsaenggi, hangul: 종생기, hanja: 終生記) and his personal memoir “Monotony” (Gwontae, hangul: 권태, hanja: 倦怠) were published posthumously in Tokyo.

In November 1936 he went to Japan, where he was arrested by Japanese police the following year. He was released on bail and admitted to Tokyo University Hospital, where he died on April 17, 1937.

Literary Relationship

Park tae-won 
Park Tae-won and Yi Sang were members of Guinhoe(九人會), which means the Circle of Nine people. And they joined the club in 1934. They first met at Dabang Jebi, which is coffee house opened by Yi Sang in Jong-no 1(il)-ga. The time when they first met is supposed June or July 1933, because, Kim Ki-rim, one of members of Guinhoe, and Ko Un wrote Jebi was held in July 1933 and Kim Ok-hee, sister of Yi Sang, wrote June of same year. The story of their first met is written in Park Tae-won’s memoir for Yi sang, “Yi sang-ui Pyeonmo (이상의 편모)” after Yi sang’s death. Park Tae-won has interest in that Yi Sang is a poet and the poem of first met poet, “Movement (운동, 運動)” .  Maintaining their relationship, Park Tae-won and Yi Sang consulted with worker of newspaper “Joseon-Jungang-ilbo” to post series of Yi Sang’s poetries, “Ogam-do(오감도, 烏瞰圖)” and Park’s novel “소설가 구보씨의 일일 (小說家仇甫氏─一日)” on the newspaper. They could put their literature in the newspapers, and Yi Sang also composed illustrations for his friend Park Tae-won’s novel, “소설가 구보씨의 일일(小說家仇甫氏─一日)". Even if, they encountered harsh criticism because of abstrusities of their literatures, after Yi Sang’s admission to “Guinhoe(九人會)” in fall of 1934, they focused on publication of bulletin “시와 소설 (Poet and Novel)” . They also have literary relationship with  Yi Sang’s poet “Movement (운동, 運動)” and Park Tae-won’s short novel “Bangranjang Juin (芳蘭莊 主人)” . Both are written in only one sentence. However, their relation is halted by Yi Sang’s death in Tokyo.

Yi Sang's Lovers 
Korean Wikipedia, '1.4 이상의 연인들'

Work
Yi was perhaps the most famous avant-garde writer of the colonial era. In his work he experimented with language, interiority, separation from inside one's self as well as the outer world. His poems, particularly, were influenced by Western literary concepts including Dadaism and Surrealism. Yi's history in architecture influenced his work, which often included the languages of mathematics and architecture including, lines, dots, number systems, equations and diagrams.

His literary legacy is punctuated by his modernist tendencies evinced throughout his oeuvre. His poems reveal the desolate internal landscape of modern humanity and, as in “Crow's eye view poem” (Ogamdo si je1ho), utilize an anti-realist technique to condense the themes of anxiety and fear. His stories disjoint the form of traditional fiction to show the conditions of the lives of modern people. “Wings” (Nalgae), for example, utilizes a stream-of-consciousness technique to express these conditions in terms of the alienation of modern people, who are fragmented commodities unable to relate to quotidian (daily) realities.

Yi Sang never received much recognition for his writing during his lifetime, but his works began to be reprinted in the 1950s.  In the 1970s his reputation soared, and in 1977 the Yi Sang Literary Award was established.  In 2007, he was listed by the Korean Poets' Association among the ten most important modern Korean poets. His most famous short story is "The Wings" ("Nalgae"), and his poem "Crow's-Eye View" is also well-known.

Work Timeline 
In 1930, he serialized his first literature work (a medium-length novel) "December 12th (hanja: 十二月 十二日, hangul: 십이월십이일)" on the Korean version of the magazine Joseon (hanja: 朝鮮, hangul: 조선), which was a magazine issued by the Government-General of Korea (hangul: 조선총독부, hanja: 朝鮮總督府) to promote their colony policies.

In 1931, he released several Japanese poems. On July 1931, he released six Japanese poems together on Joseon and Architecture; A Strange Reversible Reaction (Japanese: 異常ナ可逆反應, hangul: 이상한가역반응), The Scenery of Broken Parts (Japanese: 破片ノ景色, hangul: 파편의경치), The Amusement of ▽ (Japanese: ▽ノ遊戯, hangul: ▽의 유희), The Beard (Japanese: ひげ, hangul: 수염), BOITEUX · BOITEUSE, and The Empty Stomach (Japanese: 空腹, hangul: 공복).

On August 1931, he released a set of eight Japanese poems under the name "Bird's-Eye View" (Japanese: 鳥瞰圖, hangul: 조감도) on Joseon and Architecture. The title of each poem is "Two People ····1····" (Japanese: 二人····1····, hangul: 이인····1····), "Two People ····2····" (Japanese: 二人····2····, hangul: 이인····2····), "A Nervously Obese Triangle" (Japanese: 神経質に肥満した三角形, hangul: 신경질적으로비만한삼각형), "LE URINE", "Face" (Japanese: 顔, hangul: 안 or 얼굴), "Movement" (Japanese: 運動, hangul: 운동), "Confession of A Crazy Woman" (Japanese: 狂女の告白, hangul: 광녀의고백), "Entertainment Angel" (Japanese: 興行物天使, hangul: 흥행물천사).

On October 1931, he released a set of seven Japanese poems under the name "Three-Dimensional Angle Blueprint" (Japanese: 三次角設計圖, hangul: 삼차각설계도). The title of each poem is "Memorandum on the Line 1" (Japanese: 線に関する覚書１, hangul: 선에관한각서1), ···, and "Memorandum on the Line 7". This set of poems has many scientific terms and concepts, such as spectrum, speed of light, and time travelling.

On March and April 1932, he released two Korean novels "Darkroom of a Map" (hanja: 地圖의暗室, hangul: 지도의암실) and "Suspension of Business and Circumstances" (hanja: 休業과事情, hangul: 휴업과사정) on the magazine Joseon. He used different pen names on these two pieces; Bigu (hangul: 비구, hanja: 比久) for the former and Bosan (hangul: 보산, hanja: 甫山) for the latter.

On July 1932, he released a set of seven Japanese poems under the name "Building Infinite Hexahedral Bodies" (Japanese: 建築無限六面角體, hangul: 건축무한육면각체). The title of each poem is "AU MAGASIN DE NOUVEAUTES", "Rough Map Under Heat No.2" (Japanese: 熱下略圖 No.2, hangul: 열하약도 No. 2), "Diagnosis 0:1" (Japanese: 診断 0:1, hangul: 진단 0:1), "二十二年" (Japanese: , hangul: 이십이년), "The Publication Law" (Japanese: 出版法, hangul: 출판법), "Departure of Mr. Cha 8" (Japanese: , hangul: 차8씨의출발), "Midday―Some ESQUISSE―" (Japanese: 真昼―或るESQUISSE―, hangul: 대낮―어떤ESQUISSE―).

In 1933, he released following Korean poems: "A Flower Tree" (hangul: 꽃나무), "This Kind of Poem" (hangul: 이런시), "Mirror" (hangul: 거울).

In 1934, he released following Korean poems: "보통기념", "혈서삼태", "Crow's-Eye View" (hanja: 烏瞰圖, hangul: 오감도), "지팡이 역사", "소영위제", "산책의 가을". "혈서삼태" is a set of five poems. The title of each poem of "혈서삼태" is "오스카 와일드", "관능 위조", "하이드 씨", "악령의 감상", "혈서기삼". "오감도" is a set of 15 poems (originally designed to be 30, but was quit in the middle because of a massive complaint from readers). The title of each poem of "오감도" is "The 1st Poem" (詩第一號, 시제일호), ···, "The 15th Poem" (詩第十五號, 시제십오호) and three of them have additional title; "The 8th Poem Dissection" (詩第八號 解剖, 시제팔호 해부), "The 9th Poem Gun Muzzle" (詩第八號 銃口, 시제팔호 총구), "The 10th Poem Butterfly" (詩第十號 나비, 시제십호 나비). Some of "Crow's-Eye View" poems parodied his early Japanese works "Building Infinite Hexahedral Bodies".

From 1935 to his death in 1937, he released more than 20 literature pieces, including poems and essays. After his death, from 1937 to 1939, 16 of his posthumous works were released, including poems, essays, and novels. In 1956, nine more Japanese poems were found and their Korean translations were released. In following years, more draft notes in Japanese, which are almost certainly thought to be Yi Sang's for several reasons, were found, and they were translated into Korean and introduced from 1960 to 1976.

Work Timeline Table

Novel

Critical Nonfiction

Letter

Works in translation 
 Yi Sang: Selected Works (translated by Don Mee Choi, Jack Jung, Joyelle McSweeney, and Sawako Nakayasu), Seattle and New York: Wave Books, 2020. .
 The Wings, Seoul: Jimoondang Publishing, 2001. .
 Three Poets of Modern Korea: Yi Sang, Hahm Dong-seon, and Choi Young-mi, Louisville: Sarabande Books, 2002. 
 Meetings and farewells : Modern Korean stories, Chong-wha Chung St Lucia QLD: University of Queensland Press, 1980. 
 The Wings : eBook I-AHN CREATIVE, 2015. .

Works in Korean
Short stories
 Wings (1936) First published in literary magazine Jogwang, Sep. 1936 (issue 11)
Essays
 Lingering Impressions of a aMountain Village - a Few Paragraphs from a Journal of Travels to Seongcheon (1976) In Azalea, issue 2, p .331.
《Ennui》
《The First Wander》
Poems

 <Mirror>
 〈BOITEUX·BOITEUSE〉(《朝鮮と建築 (Joseon and Architecture)》1931.07)
 〈Architectural infinite hexahedron(Subtitle: French: AU MAGASIN DE NOUVEAUTES)〉
 <Movement (운동, (運動)>  (Poem included in series poetries "Aerial views (조감도, 鳥瞰圖)")

Fairy Tales

 <The Bull and the Goblin> (March 8, 1937)

Collections
 Collected Works of Yi Sang (1956, 1977, 1991)

References

References

External links
 Review of Wings at KTLIT

 
1910 births
1937 deaths
20th-century Korean writers
Literature of Korea under Japanese rule
Korean male writers